An impact sprinkler (sometimes called an  impulse sprinkler) is a type of irrigation sprinkler in which the sprinkler head, driven in a circular motion by the force of the outgoing water, pivots on a bearing on top of its threaded attachment nut. Invented in 1933 by Orton Englehart, it quickly found widespread use. Though it has in many situations been replaced by  gear-driven "rotor heads", many varieties of impact sprinkler remain in use.

Development

The original horizontal action impact drive sprinkler was invented in 1933 and patented in 1935 by a Glendora, California citrus grower, Orton Englehart. He later sold it to Clem and Mary La Fetra who manufactured and marketed it under the brand name Rain Bird.

Design and operation 

The sprinkler head pivots on a bearing on top of its threaded attachment nut. The head is driven in a circular motion by the force of the outgoing water, and at least one arm extends from the head. The sprinkler arm is repeatedly pushed back into the water stream by a spring. The arm's striking the water stream scatters the stream and re-orients the flow slightly, enabling a uniform watering area around the sprinkler.

Some full-circle impact heads feature a second, short range, opposing "spreader" nozzle (see image), which fills the close range watering coverage role provided by the rapid "return cycle" on part-circle heads.

By adjusting the position of the limiting collars, water flow can be directed from a full-circle pattern to one of less coverage. These limiting collars are fully adjustable by twisting with fingers to achieve the area of coverage desired.

The uninterrupted flow path of impact heads makes them less vulnerable to damage and clogging by dirt and sand in the water. Thus, they are suitable for systems fed by well water.
One defining feature of impact heads is they almost always have male pipe threads, as opposed to the female threads found on virtually all other sprinkler types.

The sprinkler head was originally manufactured from metal. Since the 1970s, they have also been manufactured from thermoplastics for improved corrosion resistance.

Usage 

The impact sprinkler's long spray radius and uniform water distribution re-creates the effect of natural rainfall. The device provides an above-ground alternative to furrow irrigation, in which trenches are dug between rows of crops and flooded.

Variations 

An underground pop-up version of the impact sprinkler was introduced as a way to avoid the problem of having to carefully and time consumingly mow around overground sprinkler heads.  When not in operation, these sprinklers disappear out of sight below turf level. Although these variants provide regular convenience, malfunctioning sprinkler heads that fail to recede may become damaged by an inattentive landscaper mowing over them.

Although largely replaced by gear-driven "rotor heads" by the 1990s, impact sprinklers still have many advantages, including uniformity of coverage, sand and grit resistance, and operation at lower water pressures.

References

External links 

 Impact sprinkler in slow motion (video clip, 33 sec)
 

American inventions
Irrigation